Visa requirements for Turkish citizens are administrative entry obligations by the authorities of other states placed on citizens of Turkey. As of 19 July 2022, Turkish citizens had visa-free or visa on arrival access to 110 countries and territories, ranking the Turkish passport 54th in terms of travel freedom according to the Henley Passport Index.

The tables indicate visa requirements for normal passport holders for tourism and other visiting purposes but do not imply entry for work, journalism, etc. Most of the countries below which are labelled as "not requiring visa", request a valid return ticket, documents for confirmed accommodation arrangements and evidence of adequate funds for self-support.

Visa requirements map

Visa requirements

Dependent, disputed, or restricted territories 
Visa requirements for Turkish citizens for visits to various territories, disputed areas, partially recognized countries and restricted zones:

Africa
  Visa on arrival if provided being aged 45 years and above or 18 years and below or residence permit issued by Australia, Canada, USA and an EU Member state.
  (outside Asmara) — visa covers Asmara only; to travel in the rest of the country, a Travel Permit for Foreigners is required (20 Eritrean nakfa).
 (Western Sahara controlled territory) — Visa not required up to 3 months.
 — Visa issued on arrival (30 days for 30 US dollars, payable on arrival also permission from the federal government of Somalia is required).
 — All foreigners traveling more than 25 kilometers outside of Khartoum must obtain a travel permit.
 Darfur — Separate travel permit is required.

Asia
 — Visa not required for 90 days.
 — Protected Area Permit (PAP) required for whole states of Nagaland and Sikkim and parts of states Mizoram, Manipur, Arunachal Pradesh, Uttaranchal, Jammu and Kashmir, Rajasthan, Himachal Pradesh. Restricted Area Permit (RAP) required for all of Andaman and Nicobar Islands and parts of Sikkim. Some of these requirements are occasionally lifted for a year.
 — Special permission required for the town of Baikonur and surrounding areas in Kyzylorda Oblast, and the town of Gvardeyskiy near Almaty.
 Kish Island — Visitors to Kish Island do not require a visa.
 — Visa not required for 30 days.
 Sabah and Sarawak — These states have their own immigration authorities and passport is required to travel to them, however the same visa applies.
 Maldives — With the exception of the capital Malé, tourists are generally prohibited from visiting non-resort islands without the express permission of the Government of Maldives.
 outside Pyongyang – People are not allowed to leave the capital city, tourists can only leave the capital with a governmental tourist guide (no independent moving)
 — Visa not required. Arrival by sea to Gaza Strip not allowed.
 — Visa on arrival for 30 days. Also eligible for an eVisa.
 Gorno-Badakhshan Autonomous Province — OIVR permit required (15+5 Tajikistani Somoni) and another special permit (free of charge) is required for Lake Sarez.
 — A special permit, issued prior to arrival by Ministry of Foreign Affairs, is required if visiting the following places: Atamurat, Cheleken, Dashoguz, Serakhs and Serhetabat.
 Tibet Autonomous Region — Tibet Travel Permit required (10 US Dollars).

 Korean Demilitarized Zone — restricted zone.
 UNDOF Zone and Ghajar — restricted zones.
 Phú Quốc — can visit without a visa for up to 30 days.
 — Special permission needed for travel outside Sana’a or Aden.

Caribbean and North Atlantic

 — Visa required - Possible to visit with a multiple entry Canada, USA or United Kingdom visa.
 — Visa required - Possible to visit with a multiple entry Schengen visa or an EU residence permit.
 Bonaire, St. Eustatius and Saba — Visa required - Possible to visit with a multiple entry Schengen visa or an EU residence permit.
 — Visa required - Possible to visit with a multiple entry US, UK or Canada visa.
 — Visa not required - 30 days.
 — Visa required. Possible to visit with US Green Card if arriving directly from USA.
 — Visitors arriving at San Andrés must buy tourist cards on arrival.
 — Visa required - Possible to visit with a multiple entry Schengen visa or an EU residence permit .
 — Visa required - eVisa Application Possible. Possible to visit with a multiple entry EU Member State, Canada or USA visa.
 — Visa required.
 Margarita Island — All visitors are fingerprinted.
 — Visa required - Possible to visit with a multiple entry US visa 
 — Visa required. Possible to visit with a multiple entry Schengen visa or an EU residence permit.
 — Visa required - Possible to visit with a multiple entry Schengen visa or an EU residence permit.
 — Visa required. Possible to visit with a multiple entry Schengen visa or an EU residence permit.
 — Visa required - Possible to visit with a multiple entry Schengen visa or an EU residence permit.
 — Visa not required 
 — Visa required - Possible to visit with a multiple entry US visa 

Europe
 — Visa required.
 — Visa required (issued for single entry for 21 days/1/2/3 months or multiple entry visa for 1/2/3 months).Travellers with Artsakh visa (expired or valid) or evidence of travel to Artsakh (stamps) will be permanently denied entry to Azerbaijan.
 Mount Athos — Special permit required (4 days: 25 euro for Orthodox visitors, 35 euro for non-Orthodox visitors, 18 euro for students). There is a visitors' quota: maximum 100 Orthodox and 10 non-Orthodox per day and women are not allowed.
 — Visa regime of Russia is applied.
 — unlimited access;. ID card valid
 UN Buffer Zone in Cyprus — Access Permit is required for travelling inside the zone, except Civil Use Areas.
 — Visa required.
 — Visa required.
 – Visa required.
  – Visa required.
  – Visa required.
 — Visa required.
 Jan Mayen — Permit issued by the local police required for staying for less than 24 hours and permit issued by the Norwegian police for staying for more than 24 hours.
 – Visa required.
 — Visa free for 90 days.
 Closed cities and regions in Russia — special authorization required.
 — Visa free. Multiple entry visa to Russia and three-day prior notification are required to enter South Ossetia.
 — Visa free. Registration required after 24h.

Oceania
 — Visa required (entry permit).
 Ashmore and Cartier Islands — special authorisation required.
 Clipperton Island — special permit required.
 — Visa free access for 31 days.
 Lau Province — Special permission required. If you are traveling to the Lau group of islands by yacht, you need special permission from your first port of entry into Fiji.
 — Visa required.
 — Visa required.
 — Visa required.
 — Visa on arrival valid for 30 days is issued free of charge.
  — Visa required.
 — 14 days visa free and landing fee US$35 or tax of US$5 if not going ashore.
 — Visa required (entry permit).
 United States Minor Outlying Islands — special permits required for Baker Island, Howland Island, Jarvis Island, Johnston Atoll, Kingman Reef, Midway Atoll, Palmyra Atoll and Wake Island.
 — Visa required. Possible to visit with a multiple entry Schengen visa or an EU residence permit.

South America
  Galápagos — Online pre-registration is required. Transit Control Card must also be obtained at the airport prior to departure.

South Atlantic and Antarctica
 — Visitor Permit valid for 4 weeks is issued on arrival.

 — eVisa for 3 months within any year period.
 — eVisa.
 — Permission to land required for 15/30 pounds sterling (yacht/ship passenger) for Tristan da Cunha Island or 20 pounds sterling for Gough Island, Inaccessible Island or Nightingale Islands.
 — Pre-arrival permit from the Commissioner required (72 hours/1 month for 110/160 pounds sterling).
 — Certain countries will deny access to holders of Israeli visas or passport stamps of Israel because of the Arab League boycott of Israel.

Non-ordinary passports
In addition to countries that provide visa-free access to all Turkish passport holders, holders of diplomatic or service Turkish passports have visa-free access to the following additional countries:

Bahrain, Burkina Faso, Cambodia and South Sudan allow holders of diplomatic, official, service and special passports issued to nationals of any country to obtain a visa on arrival. Yemen allows holders of diplomatic and service passports of Turkey to obtain a visa on arrival.

Some of the countries that exempt Turkish citizens from visa requirement offer longer period of stay or more beneficial terms to diplomatic or service passport holders than to the ordinary passport holders.

Consular protection of Turkish citizens abroad

There are 142 resident embassies, 89 consulates and Total of 235 states that recognise Turkey.

See also List of diplomatic missions of Turkey.

Non-visa restrictions

See also

Visa policy of Turkey
Turkish passport
Foreign relations of Turkey

References and Notes
References

Notes

Turkey
Foreign relations of Turkey